Treflach is a small village near Oswestry in Shropshire, England. It is in the Oswestry Rural parish and lies between two other villages Trefonen and Nantmawr. Together these three villages have a village design statement.

References

External links

Hamlets in Shropshire
Villages in Shropshire